Night Eyes is a 1990 American erotic thriller film written by Tom Citrano and Andrew Stevens and directed by Jag Mundhra. It stars Andrew Stevens, Tanya Roberts, Cooper Huckabee, and Warwick Sims. The film was followed by a series of sequels following similar plots.

Plot summary
Will Griffith is the owner of a security and surveillance company in Los Angeles. Will is hired by a rock star named Brian Walker, who is undergoing a messy divorce from his philandering wife Nikki, to rig the Walkers' home with video cameras to capture Nikki cheating on him with various lovers. During this job, Will gets to know Nikki better and ultimately grows more attracted to and protective of her, eventually ending up having an affair with her. Brian discovers their relationship, becomes jealous and breaks into the home in a fit of rage and is killed by Will in an act of self-defense. Events start to unfold and Will begins to realize that he may have been used as a decoy for something much bigger than he thought.

Cast
 Andrew Stevens as Will Griffith
 Tanya Roberts as Nikki Walker
 Cooper Huckabee as Ernie
 Stephen Meadows as Michael Vincent
 Warwick Sims as Brian Walker
 Veronica Henson-Phillips as Lauretta
 Karen Elise Baldwin as Ellen
 Yvette Buchanan as Baby Doll
 Steven Burks as Tom Clemmons
 Paul Carr as Tom Michaelson
 Dena Drotar as Muffy Goldstein
 Larry Poindexter as Bard Goldstein
 Chick Vennera as Shapiro

Production
Night Eyes was filmed within a month, starting on November 27, 1989 and finishing in December. It was filmed in Los Angeles, California, while a sequence was filmed in Kenya.

Sequels
There was a series of sequels, all of which feature Andrew Stevens on the role of Will Griffith. The first two (Night Eyes 2 and Night Eyes 3) feature Shannon Tweed in the lead female role, while the fourth one features Paula Barbieri.

References

External links 
 

1990 films
1990s erotic thriller films
American independent films
American erotic thriller films
Films directed by Jag Mundhra
1990 independent films
1990s English-language films
1990s American films